Moti Mahal may refer to:

 Moti Mahal (restaurant), an Indian restaurant where well known dishes originated
 Moti Mahal (Gulshan-e-Iqbal), one of the oldest houses in Karachi, Pakistan
 Moti Shahi Mahal, the Sardar Vallabhbhai Patel National Memorial
  Moti Mahal, Lucknow, campus of the English and Foreign Languages University	
 Moti Mahal, 1952 film by Hansraj Behl